Pangyo Airport (a.k.a.Ichon Northeast Airport) is an airport in Pangyo County, Kangwon-do, North Korea.

Facilities 
The airfield has a single grass runway 03/21 measuring 3900 x 207 feet (1189 x 63 m).  It is sited in a small river valley.

References 

Airports in North Korea
Kangwon Province (North Korea)